"Escape Song" / "Mountain of Regret" is a double a-side single by Graham Coxon from his fourth solo album The Kiss of Morning in 2002. It was released as a very limited 7" (only 1500 copies) on 14 October 2002. It was a minor hit on the UK Singles Chart, peaking at number 96.

Track listing
 Promo CD TRANSCDDJ020
 "Escape Song"
 "Mountain of Regret"
 7" TRAN020
 "Escape Song"
 "Mountain of Regret"

External links
 Official discography link
 Fansite singles discography link
 Transcopic Records Label

2001 singles
Graham Coxon songs